Dr. Tso Wung-wai (born 28 February 1941), BBS is a Hong Kong politician and chemistry professor. He is an adjunct professor at the Chinese University of Hong Kong, and has also served as a Hong Kong delegate to the National People's Congress of the People's Republic of China.

Tso Wung-wai completed his bachelor's degree in biochemistry  at CUHK, took an M.Sc in Miami, and went on to study for his Ph.D at the University of Wisconsin–Madison. He is a member of the Hong Kong Progressive Alliance (HKPA).

2004 Legislative Council election
Prior to the 2004 Hong Kong Legislative Council election, the pro-Beijing camp predicted that the competition would be fierce. Some of the HKPA LegCo candidates were persuaded to quit the election, in an attempt to enable Democratic Alliance for the Betterment of Hong Kong (DAB) candidates to stand a higher chances of obtaining LegCo seats. In response to this, David Chu Yu-lin, originally a candidate for the LegCo constituency of the New Territories East, was replaced by Tso. He had a slim chance of obtaining a seat in the election, and unsurprisingly he lost with just 14,174 votes, less than a quarter of any other list in the same constituency.

During his campaigns, Tso gained prominence for his slogans. One of his best-known slogans was 科學求真，智識救港 (literally, Seek the truth with science, and save Hong Kong with knowledge).

References

External links 
Tso Wung-wai's homepage (in Chinese only)
CUHK Biochemistry Webpage

1941 births
Living people
Academic staff of the Chinese University of Hong Kong
Alumni of the Chinese University of Hong Kong
University of Wisconsin–Madison alumni
Delegates to the 9th National People's Congress from Hong Kong
Delegates to the 10th National People's Congress from Hong Kong
Delegates to the 11th National People's Congress from Hong Kong
Liberal Democratic Federation of Hong Kong politicians
Hong Kong Progressive Alliance politicians
Democratic Alliance for the Betterment and Progress of Hong Kong politicians
New Hong Kong Alliance politicians
District councillors of Sha Tin District
Hong Kong Basic Law Consultative Committee members
Hong Kong Affairs Advisors
Members of the Selection Committee of Hong Kong